Kenny Marco is a Canadian guitarist who has been a member of historical Canadian rock groups such as Grant Smith & The Power, Motherlode and Dr. Music. He was also a member of Blood, Sweat And Tears.

Background
He has been described as the most prolific guitarist in the history of Canadian rock and roll. He has been a member of supergroups in the 1970s from Motherlode to Dr. Music and Blood Sweat & Tears. In later years, the musical genres he plays in include American funk/jazz and Brazilian cha cha.

The son of a music store owner, he grew up in Brantford. The expected music path for him was to play the accordion like his brothers. Instead he took a different direction and learnt the guitar. He got his first guitar while still working as a newspaper boy on his paper route. He later attended Pauline Johnson Collegiate in Brantford, Ontario. He joined the high school band The Galaxies, and later at age 17, he hit the road with the Beau-Keys, his first road band, leaving his mother looking anxious as he left home.

Career

1960s to 1980s
In 1968, he played guitar on Grant Smith & The Power's debut album,  Keep On Running. Among the musicians on the album were Wayne Stone, William "Smitty" Smith on keyboards and Steve Kennedy on saxophone. There was some dissatisfaction felt by these musicians. They were unhappy about playing mostly covers. They were also disappointed with the lack of success with the record album. Leaving the band, the four of them relocated to London, Ontario, and formed the group Motherlode. They went on to have the hit "When I Die". 

When Motherlode broke up in December 1969, Marco, Steve Kennedy and Wayne Stone went on to be members of Dr. Music in Toronto, Ontario, Canada. He replaced guitarist Jon Palma. As a member of Dr. Music, one of the albums he played on was the self-titled album in 1972, released on GRT RCC 23172. He played on the Tequila Sunrise by David Clayton-Thomas that was released that year.

1990s to 2000s
In March 2015, Marco and Theresa Sokyrka were set to play a benefit concert for the Hope Cancer Centre. He had worked with Sokyra previously, playing on her 2005 album, These Old Charms.

References

Further reading
 Blitz, Number 43/ July-August 1982 - The Kenny Marco Story: Grant Smith and the Power, Motherlode
 citizenfreak.com (© Museum of Canadian Music) Kenny Marco biography
 Saskatchewan Arts Alliance, Tuesday, March 23, 2004, Kenny Marco

Grant Smith & The Power members
Motherlode (band) members
Dr. Music members
Blood, Sweat & Tears members
Year of birth missing (living people)
Living people
Canadian guitarists
Quality Records artists